Jag är Markoolio is the eighth studio album by Markoolio, which was released on 6 June 2012.

Track listing

Charts

References 

2012 albums
Markoolio albums
Swedish-language albums